Wisin & Yandel Presentan: La Mente Maestra (Wisin & Yandel Present: The Master Mind) is the third compilation album by WY Records and is Nesty "La Mente Maestra"'s first album. It is presented by Wisin & Yandel and was released on October 28, 2008 by WY Records and Machete Music. The album features production of famous reggaeton producers Nesty "La Mente Maestra" and Victor "El Nasi", as well as an introduction to some underground-successful reggaeton artists Jayko, Gadiel, Franco "El Gorila", and Tico "El Imigrante". The album also features contributions by  Tony Dize and Alexis & Fido. The first single, "Me Estás Tentando", was released on October 21, 2008. The single debuted on the Billboard Hot Latin Songs chart at #50, and has so far peaked at #14. It also charted on the Billboard Latin Rhythm Airplay chart at #4. La Mente Maestra won the Lo Nuestro Award for Urban Album of the Year.

Track listing

Charts

Sales and certifications

Credits and personnel
 Ernesto F. Padilla (Nesty 'La Mente Maestra') – General/Executive/Musical Producer
 Juan Luis Morera (Wisin) – Co-Executive Producer
 Llandel Veguilla (Yandel) – Co-Executive Producer
 Victor Martinez (Victor 'El Nasi') – Co-Musical Producer, Recording
 Jose Gomez (El Profesor Gomez) – Co-Musical Producer
 Ana J. Alvarado – Production Coordinator
 Mario de Jesus (Marioso) – Mixer
 Iancarlo "Conqui" Reyes – Creative Director, Design, Digital Post-Production
 Edwin David – Photography
 Ed Coriano – Stylist
 Alesi – Accessories

References

2008 compilation albums
Wisin & Yandel albums
WY Records compilation albums